Leccinum barrowsii is a species of bolete fungus in the family Boletaceae. It is found in the southwestern United States, where it grows on the ground under conifers. The bolete was described as new to science in 1966 by mycologists Alexander H. Smith, Harry Delbert Thiers, and Roy Watling. The specific epithet honours the collector, Charles "Chuck" Barrows (1903–1989).

See also
List of Leccinum species
List of North American boletes

References

Fungi described in 1966
Fungi of the United States
barrowsii
Fungi without expected TNC conservation status